The R142 is the first successful model class of the newest generation or new technology (NTT) A Division cars for the New York City Subway. It was built by Bombardier Transportation in La Pocatière, Quebec, Canada and Barre, Vermont, U.S. with final assembly performed at Plattsburgh, New York, from 1999 to 2003. There are 880 cars numbered 6301–7180 and another 150 cars numbered 1101–1250, for a total of 1,030 cars, all arranged as five-car sets. Together with the R142As, they replaced the Redbird trains, including the R26, R28, R29, R33, R33S, and R36.

The R142s and R142As are the first New York City Subway cars to feature recorded announcements. The first R142s were delivered on November 16, 1999, though they initially experienced minor issues that were reported while undergoing testing. Following the completion of non-revenue service testing, the R142s were placed into revenue service on July 10, 2000 as part of its 30-day revenue acceptance test. After successful completion, it entered revenue service on October 20, 2000. The last R142s were delivered by mid-2003. In January 2019, the MTA proposed mid-life upgrades to the R142 fleet.

Description
880 of the R142s are numbered 6301–7180, and the remaining 150 cars are numbered 1101–1250.

There are two types of cars: "A" (cab at one end) and "B" (no cabs). "A" cars are powered with four traction motors each, with the passenger doors opposite each other. The "B" cars are powered by two traction motors at the number-two end, and the passenger doors are staggered (car ends are numbered on the lower body just above the truck). The trains are linked up in 5-car, A-B-B-B-A sets, but also can be linked in sets of 4 cars (A-B-B-A), 6 cars (A-B-B-B-B-A), 9 cars (one 5-car set and one 4-car set), or 11 cars (one 5-car set and one 6-car set).

Features

The R142s feature Alstom ONIX AC propulsion systems, electronic braking, automatic climate control, electronic strip maps, and an on-board intercom system; the traction motors of the R142s were later used on the majority of the R160 subway cars when they were first delivered. The R142 and the R142A were partly designed by Antenna Design.

Like the R110As, the R142s feature wider doors than past A-Division equipment, with 54-inch side doors (about 9 inches narrower than the R110As' 63-inch doors, but 4 inches wider than the R62/As' 50-inch doors). All car ends have windows, allowing passengers to see through to the next car, except cab ends, where the cab walls prevent such visibility. The R142 car bodies are constructed from stainless steel.

The R142s and R142As are the first New York City Subway cars to feature recorded announcements. All passenger cars built after them also use this feature. Newer, shorter announcements have been tested on some sets on the 2 and 5 since 2015 in an effort to reduce dwell times and subsequently reduce the likelihood of delays, but were later replaced with the standard announcements. The R142s are visually very similar to the R142As and R188s, but due to electrical incompatibilities, the three types are not interoperable.

History

On April 30, 1997, the Board of the Metropolitan Transportation Authority approved the purchase of 680 cars from Bombardier (the R142s) and 400 cars from Kawasaki (the R142As). The original purchase order was for 740 cars, but because of the intense competition between the firms, the MTA was able to purchase 340 additional cars at the same price. The entire cost of the purchase was $1.45 billion. The new subway cars were based on the results of the tests from the R110A and R110B test trains. The historic deal came after round-the-clock negotiations, and the contract was the largest subway car purchase in the history of the New York City Subway up to this point.

The first ten R142s, 6301–6310, were delivered on November 16, 1999. However, minor issues were reported to be found and have since been corrected during troubleshooting during the testing phase. After successful completion, it entered revenue service on October 20, 2000. The last R142s were delivered by March 2003.

Between 2016 and 2018, the MTA replaced the individual strip maps for cars assigned to the 2 and 5 with combined strip maps showing both services, due to the two services having large amounts of route overlap on the IRT White Plains Road, Eastern Parkway, and Nostrand Avenue lines, and because the R142s assigned to the East 180th Street and 239th Street yards are shared between the two lines.

In January 2019, the MTA proposed mid-life upgrades to several train subsystems in the R142 and R142A fleets. These included changes to the HVAC, propulsion, and door systems; the addition of Ethernet on the R142 fleet; and conversion of the fleet to be compatible with communications-based train control, in conjunction with subway signal upgrades along the IRT Lexington Avenue Line and IRT Seventh Avenue Line. The R142 fleet would also be retrofitted with a "monitoring and diagnostics system".

In March 2021, car 7021 its route and destination signs upgraded to LEDs. The route portion of the sign also received a green circle/red diamond LED for the route display, similar to those on the R62A sets currently used on the 6 route. Car 7171 received the same modifications in mid-2021. It is currently unknown if the remainder of the rolling stock will be retrofitted with these features.

Incidents
On March 27, 2020, a northbound 2 train with operating lead consist 6346–6350 and trailing consist 6366–6370 was set on fire while traveling from 96th Street to Central Park North–110th Street. While the trailing consist was relatively unscathed and eventually returned to service in November 2020, the lead consist suffered extensive damage and was retired. The fire erupted on board car 6347, damaging that car, as well as additional fire and smoke damage to the rest of the set, along with some moderate fire damage to the station as well. As a result, the whole set was taken out of service and stripped for parts. The train operator was killed, and 16 people were injured. A man accused of setting the fire was arrested and charged with murder in December 2020.

Notes

References

External links

nycsubway.org - NYC Subway Cars: R142
R142 Traction Motor
Bombardier/Kawasaki Truck Comparison (Bomb on top and Kawasaki underneath)
Car Status/Assignment

Train-related introductions in 1999
Bombardier Transportation multiple units
New York City Subway rolling stock